Gotha – Ilm-Kreis is an electoral constituency (German: Wahlkreis) represented in the Bundestag. It elects one member via first-past-the-post voting. Under the current constituency numbering system, it is designated as constituency 192. It is located in west-central Thuringia, comprising the districts of Gotha and Ilm-Kreis.

Gotha – Ilm-Kreis was created for the inaugural 1990 federal election after German reunification. Since 2021, it has been represented by Marcus Bühl of the Alternative for Germany (AfD).

Geography
Gotha – Ilm-Kreis is located in west-central Thuringia. As of the 2021 federal election, it comprises the districts of Gotha and Ilm-Kreis.

History
Gotha – Ilm-Kreis was created after German reunification in 1990, then known as Gotha – Arnstadt. It acquired its current name in the 2002 election. In the 1990 through 1998 elections, it was constituency 299 in the numbering system. In the 2002 and 2005 elections, it was number 193. Since the 2009 election, it has been number 192.

Originally, the constituency comprised the districts of Gotha and Arnstadt. It acquired its current borders in the 2002 election.

Members
The constituency was first represented by Gerhard Päselt of the Christian Democratic Union (CDU) from 1990 to 1998. Gerhard Neumann won it for the Social Democratic Party (SPD) in 1998 and served a single term. He was succeeded by fellow SPD member Petra Heß from 2002 to 2009. Tankred Schipanski of the CDU was elected in 2009, and re-elected in 2013 and 2017. Marcus Bühl won the constituency for the Alternative for Germany (AfD) in 2021.

Election results

2021 election

2017 election

2013 election

2009 election

References

Federal electoral districts in Thuringia
1990 establishments in Germany
Constituencies established in 1990
Gotha (district)
Ilm-Kreis